Cores e Aromas is the second album by the Portuguese music composer António Pinho Vargas. It was released in 1985.

Track listing

Personnel
 António Pinho Vargas - piano
 José Nogueira - saxophone
 Pedro Barreiros - double bass
 Mário Barreiros - drums

1985 albums
António Pinho Vargas albums